The Packers Heritage Trail is a self-guided walking tour that traverses locations relating to the history of the Green Bay Packers. 22 of the sites have bronze commemorative plaques. 21 sites are located within a two-mile radius of downtown Green Bay.

Plaza

The Packers Heritage Trail Plaza is located along the route at the northeast corner of Washington and Cherry streets in downtown Green Bay. It houses statues of pro football and Green Bay Packers Hall of Fame members Paul Hornung and Johnny Blood, and team co-founder George Whitney Calhoun.

References

Sources

Bibliography

 
Culture of Green Bay, Wisconsin
History of the Green Bay Packers
Tourist attractions in Brown County, Wisconsin
Urban heritage trails